The 1959 FA Cup final was contested by Nottingham Forest and Luton Town at Wembley. Forest won 2–1, with goals from Roy Dwight and Tommy Wilson just four minutes apart. Dave Pacey scored Luton's consolation goal. Forest were playing in their second FA Cup final, while Luton were making their only final appearance in their history.

Road to Wembley

Nottingham Forest

{| class="wikitable" style="text-align: center"
|-
!Round!!Home team!!Score!!Away team!!Date!!Attendance
|-
|Round 3||Tooting & Mitcham United||2–2||Nottingham Forest||10 January 1959||14300
|-
|Round 3 Replay'||Nottingham Forest||3–0||Tooting & Mitcham United||24 January 1959||42320
|-
|Round 4||Nottingham Forest||4-1||Grimsby Town||28 January 1959||34289
|-
|Round 5||Birmingham City||1–1||Nottingham Forest||14 February 1959||55300
|-
|Round 5 1st Replay||Nottingham Forest||1–1||Birmingham City||18 February 1959||39431
|-
|Round 5 2nd Replay||Birmingham City||0-5||Nottingham Forest||23 February 1959||34458
|-
|Round 6||Nottingham Forest||2–1||Bolton Wanderers||28 February 1959||44414
|-
|rowspan="2"|Semi Final||Nottingham Forest||1-0||Aston Villa||14 March 1959||65707
|-
|colspan=4 align=center|(at Hillsborough, Sheffield)
|}

Luton Town

Match Summary
The game was notable for an unusually large number of stoppages due to injury, particularly to Nottingham Forest players, which was put down to the lush nature of the Wembley turf. The most notable of these stoppages occurred when goalscorer Roy Dwight was carried off the pitch after breaking his leg in a tackle with Brendan McNally after 33 minutes.

This also proved a turning point in the game as Forest had been the more dominant team to that point, leading by two goals at the time. Luton gradually took control of the match from this point on, scoring midway through the second half.

Forest were reduced to nine fit men with ten minutes remaining when Bill Whare was crippled with cramp, being forced to play wide on the wing where he was little more than a spectator.

The high volume of injuries during the second half led to four minutes of additional time being added on by the referee, during which time Luton twice came close to forcing extra time as Allan Brown headed narrowly wide of goal before Billy Bingham hit the side netting. Given the condition of the Forest team at that time it would have been a remarkable feat for them to have won the game or even forced a replay in extra time had Luton equalised.

At the final whistle the Forest manager Billy Walker entered the field to congratulate his team and was chased by a steward who tried to marshall him back off. The steward mistook Walker to be a pitch invader.

Match details

Coverage
The game was televised live on the BBC Grandstand programme, which introduced score captions into their broadcast for the first time in an FA Cup final. This however caused much annoyance in Nottingham where their team's name was displayed on the screen at regular intervals as Notts Forest. Commentator Kenneth Wolstenholme apologised live on air for the mistake, stating that the caption should read Nott'm Forest.

During the game the Forest fans were heard to sing the theme tune to the then-popular television programme The Adventures of Robin Hood'' (the legendary outlaw who was allegedly from Nottingham). This was the first time ever that popular television culture had made its way into a terrace song during a cup final.

References

External links
Line-ups
Cup report 
Team kits

FA Cup Finals
FA Cup Final
FA Cup Final 1959
FA Cup Final 1959
FA Cup Final
FA Cup Final
Final